Wazir Mohammad (born 22 December 1929) is a former Pakistani cricketer and banker who played in 20 Test matches for Pakistan national cricket team between 1952 and 1959. 

Wazir was a determined middle-order batsman with a strong defence. His highest Test score was 189, in the Fifth Test against West Indies at Port of Spain in 1957-58, when he batted for six and three-quarter hours and laid the foundation for Pakistan's innings victory. He was Pakistan's top-scorer with 42 not out when they won by 24 runs against England at The Oval in 1954. His first-class career extended from 1950 to 1964, when he captained Karachi Whites to a narrow defeat in the final of the 1963-64 Quaid-e-Azam Trophy. He was appointed to captain the Pakistan Eaglets team of young players on their tour of England in 1963; 14 of the 18 players on the tour became Test cricketers, and four became Test captains.

Wazir worked as a banker, mostly with the National Bank of Pakistan. His younger brothers Hanif, Mushtaq and Sadiq also played Test cricket for Pakistan. Wazir lives in Solihull, England. Since the death of Israr Ali on 1 February 2016, he has been Pakistan's oldest living Test cricketer.

References

External links
 
 Wazir Mohammad at CricketArchive

1929 births
Living people
Pakistani cricketers
Pakistan Test cricketers
Bahawalpur cricketers
Karachi cricketers
People from Junagadh
Cricketers from Karachi
Karachi Blues cricketers
Karachi Whites cricketers
Karachi A cricketers
East Zone (Pakistan) cricketers
Pakistan Eaglets cricketers
Pakistani people of Gujarati descent
Pakistani bankers